The 2021 CECAFA Kagame Interclub Cup was 43rd edition of the Kagame Interclub Cup, a football competition for clubs in East and Central Africa, which is organised by CECAFA. It took place in Tanzania from 1 to 14 August 2021.

Participants clubs
The following eight teams will contest in the tournament.

Venues
The following two venues hosted for the matches of the tournament.

Draw
The draw ceremony of the tournament were held on 28 July 2021 at Dar es Salam, Tanzania. Total eight team were divided into two groups.

Group summary

Match officials

Referees
 Georges Gatogato (Burundi)
 Thierry Nkurunziza (Burundi)
 Mfaume Nassoro (Zanzibar)
 Elly Ally Sasii (Tanzania)
 William Oloya (Uganda)
 Ring Malong (South Sudan)

Assistant Referees
 Mohamed Mkono (Tanzania)
 Frank Komba (Tanzania)
 Soud Iddi Lila (Tanzania)
 Willy Habimana (Burundi)
 Désiré Nkurunziza (Burundi)
 Gasim Muder Dehiya (South Sudan)
 Duwuki Robert Henry (South Sudan)
 Ronald Katenya (Uganda)

Group stage

Group A

Group B

Knockout stage
In the knockout stage, extra-time and a penalty shoot-out will be used to decide the winner if necessary.

Bracket

Semi-finals

Third place match

Final

Statistics

Goalscorers

References

External links

Kagame Interclub Cup
Kagame Interclub Cup
2021 in Tanzanian sport
International association football competitions hosted by Tanzania